Rosarin is a cinnamyl alcohol glycoside isolated from Rhodiola rosea.

References

External links
 Purification of Phenylalkanoids and monoterpene glycosides from Rhodiola rosea L. roots by high-speed counter-current chromatography

Phenylpropanoid glycosides